Nicarete cineraria is a species of beetle in the family Cerambycidae. It was described by Fairmaire in 1900.

References

Desmiphorini
Beetles described in 1900